Atif Dudaković (born 2 December 1954) is a retired Bosnian general who served in the Army of Republic of Bosnia and Herzegovina. During the Bosnian War, Dudaković was in command of the Bihać enclave, which was surrounded and besieged from 1991 to 1995, commanding the 5th Corps. After the war he became the general commander of the Army of the Federation of Bosnia and Herzegovina. In 2018, he was charged with war crimes.

Early life and education
Dudaković was born in the village of Orahova near Gradiška. He served in the Yugoslav People's Army (JNA), teaching at an artillery school in Zadar and a military academy in Belgrade.

Career
In 1991, at the beginning of the Croatian War of Independence, he served as the artillery superintendent of the 9th Corps of the JNA with headquarters in Knin, and was directly subordinated to the Serb General Ratko Mladić. At this point he left the federal army.

After the outbreak of the war in Bosnia, Dudaković joined the newly established Army of the Republic of Bosnia and Herzegovina (ARBiH). Eventually he became commander of the 5th Corps, defending Bihać. The situation there was difficult as Bihać was surrounded on all sides by enemies of the ARBiH: by the Army of Republika Srpska; by Republic of Serb Krajina; and by forces of the Autonomous Province of Western Bosnia, the renegade Bosniak forces of Fikret Abdić. The 5th Corps successfully defended the enclave and in 1995 broke out from the encirclement and captured the towns of Bosanski Petrovac, Bosanska Krupa, Ključ, Sanski Most and were on the verge of entering Prijedor and Banja Luka before the United States and NATO threatened to bomb the Bosnian forces if they didn’t stop.

After the war he continued to serve in the Bosnian army, holding the top positions of Deputy Chief of Joint General Staff of Army of the Federation of Bosnia and Herzegovina and Commander of Joint Command of Army of the Federation.

Since 2005 he has been under investigation for war crimes allegedly committed against ethnic Serbs in 1995.

In September 2006, the Serbian television stations B92 and Radio Television of Serbia broadcast two video tapes one of which apparently shows Dudaković giving an order of "fire" or "burn it all" referring to a Serb village during Operation Sana in 1995. After the video was released Dudaković gave a statement saying:

In 2010, he joined the Party for Bosnia and Herzegovina of Haris Silajdžić.

War crimes charges
In April 2018, police detained Atif Dudaković and 12 others on suspicion of committing crimes against humanity during the Bosnian war. All were members of the Bosnian army's 5th Corps, which under Dudaković's leadership was in charge of the Bihac area. They were suspected of having carried out atrocities against civilians including ethnic Serbs and Bosniaks, who were loyal to other Bosnian leaders, and prisoners during the war. The case against them was based on more than 100 witness interviews, video footage and evidence from exhumations. Bosniaks rallied in Sarajevo, carried a large banner reading "Heroes, not criminals!", to express their support to them. Dudaković and the others are accused of killing over 300 civilians and the destruction of 38 Serb Orthodox churches. In October 2018, Dudaković was formally indicted for crimes against humanity.

Military ranks
JNA
Major (1988)

ARBiH
Brigadier
Brigadier general (21 August 1994)
Division general (7 August 1995)
Lieutenant general

References

1953 births
Living people
Bosniaks of Bosnia and Herzegovina
Bosnia and Herzegovina Muslims
Bosnia and Herzegovina generals
People from Gradiška, Bosnia and Herzegovina
Army of the Republic of Bosnia and Herzegovina soldiers
Military personnel of the Croatian War of Independence
Officers of the Yugoslav People's Army